That Boy is a 1974 gay pornographic film written, produced and directed by Peter Berlin, his first and only feature-length pornographic film. It is also the second and last feature-length porn film in which he appeared as an actor following the huge success of Nights in Black Leather (1973). Although he is credited as director, producer and actor under the name Peter Burian, following the threat of a lawsuit from another actor named Peter Burian he changed his name to Peter Berlin and became hugely popular under the new name.

Synopsis
This was as popular as Berlin's first film. This second feature film tells a more complicated story of Peter Berlin's alter ego Helmut who drifts around south of Market and Polk Street areas of San Francisco.

When Helmut meets a blind boy (Arron Black) and becomes fascinated by him, the film begins a series of fantasies within fantasies that quickly take it out of the realm of standard gay porn.

Cast
Peter Berlin (credited as Peter Burian)
Arron Black as The Blind Boy
Pristine Condition		
Chastity White

External links

1974 films
1970s pornographic films
Gay pornographic films
1974 LGBT-related films
Films set in San Francisco